Emil Antoni Korytko (7 September 1813 – 31 January 1839) was a Polish political activist in the period of the Great Emigration, who was exiled to Ljubljana, Carniola (now Slovenia) and became an important ethnographer, philologist and translator there. His legacy are collections of Slovene folk songs and vivid descriptions of Carniolan folk customs. He significantly contributed to the mutual dialogue between Polish and Slovene authors and readers.

Early life and study
Korytko was born on 7 September 1813 in Zhezhava (now Zelenyi Hai, Zalishchyky Raion) or Lviv in Austrian Galicia (now in the Ternopil Oblast in Ukraine). From 1832, he studied philosophy and philology at the University of Lwow. He participated in the November Uprising.

Exile into Ljubljana

In Ljubljana, Korytko became a close collaborator of the Slovene national Romantic circle. He became a personal friend of the Slovene poet France Prešeren, and helped him translate several poems by Adam Mickiewicz into German. He also translated some of Prešeren's poems into German. He studied Slovene folk songs from Carniola, which he published in five volumes, and Carniolan folk customs. He prompted the painter Franz Kurz zum Turn und Goldenstein to paint 70 portraits of people in various folk costumes.

Korytko died in Ljubljana due to typhus, and was buried at Navje (then St. Christopher's Cemetery) in the Bežigrad District. His funeral was one of the first public manifestations of Slovene patriotism. Among the young Slovene patriots chosen to carry Korytko's coffin was Karel Dežman.

Commemoration
In November 2013, the celebration of 200th anniversary of Korytko's birth was held in Ljubljana, organised by the Polish Embassy and the University of Ljubljana. An exhibition has been held in the National and University Library of Slovenia since 7 November, and a commemorative postage stamp was issued. In 2019 an exhibition devoted to Korytko was held in the Slovenian Parliament, and a special Slovenian–Polish volume was published. In 2023, the Post of Slovenia issued a stamp commemorating the 210th anniversary of Korytko's birth.

References

External links

Online version of Korytko's collection of Slovene folk songs 

1813 births
1839 deaths
Polish ethnographers
Polish philologists
Polish translators
University of Lviv alumni
Deaths from typhus
Activists of the Great Emigration
Writers from Lviv
19th-century translators